Dr. Friedrich Joseph Haass (Fyodor Petrovich Gaaz; 10 August 1780 – ) was the "holy doctor of Moscow". Born in Bad Münstereifel, as a member of Moscow's governmental prison committee, he spent 25 years until the end of his life to humanize the penal system. During the last nine years before his death, he spent all of his assets to run a hospital for homeless people. He died in Moscow. Twenty thousand people attended his funeral at the Vvedenskoye Cemetery, which was paid for by the state as he had no more money.

He has a Catholic remembrance day of the 16th of August.

See also

References

Koni, Anatolij Fedorovic: "Doktor Friedrich Haass. Lebensskizze eines deutschen Philanthropen in Rußland", in: Zur Geschichte des russischen Gefängniswesens im 19. Jahrhundert, auf Veranlassung von Graf Gregor Stroganoff aus dem Russischen ins Deutsche übersetzt, Verlag von Duncker & Humblot, Leipzig 1899.

External links
Friedrich Haass School
Friedrich Joseph Haass: Ökumenisches Heiligenlexikon

Physicians from the Russian Empire
German emigrants to the Russian Empire
1780 births
1853 deaths
Burials at Vvedenskoye Cemetery